WYPR (88.1 FM) is a public radio station serving the Baltimore, Maryland metropolitan area. Its studio is in the Charles Village neighborhood of northern Baltimore, while its transmitter is in Park Heights. The station is simulcast in the Frederick and Hagerstown area on WYPF (88.1 FM) and in the Ocean City area on WYPO (106.9 FM).

WYPR is Baltimore's flagship National Public Radio member station, carrying content from NPR, American Public Media (the distribution arm of Minnesota Public Radio), Public Radio Exchange and the BBC World Service (on HD2). WYPR also provides Classical 24 on its HD3 subchannel. In addition, WYPR produces several of its own shows, including the public affairs-focused programs Midday and On The Record, the award-winning, sonic-storytelling series Out of the Blocks as well as local news coverage and special newsroom series.

Starting in 2015, the Baltimore Magazine Reader's Poll has named WYPR the Best Radio Station in Baltimore three years in a row. The station also won Best Radio Show Host, and Best News Website in 2017.

History
The station signed on in 1979 as WJHU, a 10-watt student-run station owned by Johns Hopkins University. It took over from a carrier current station that had operated under the same calls on AM 830 since 1945. Originally a typical freeform college radio station, it boosted its power to 25,000 watts in 1985, allowing it at least secondary coverage of the entire Baltimore/Washington corridor.  Soon after the power increase, Johns Hopkins converted the station into a full-time professional operation, allowing it to become Baltimore's NPR member station.  It originally aired a mix of classical music and NPR programming, but on June 23, 1995, switched to a primarily news/talk format.

Johns Hopkins put the station up for sale in 2000 due to the expense of maintaining it, as well as a change in focus that no longer included radio.  In 2002, Your Public Radio Corp., a community group, bought the station and changed its calls to WYPR. In 2004 Your Public Radio Corp. bought religious broadcaster WJTM in Frederick, which became a relay of WYPR with the call letters of WYPF. WYPF's signal also covers Hagerstown. On July 30, 2007, Your Public Radio Corp. bought Ocean City, Maryland alternative rock station 106.9 WRXS, which began simulcasting WYPR starting September 10, 2007. That station was renamed WYPO on October 3, 2007.  The three stations provide at least distant-grade coverage to almost two-thirds of Maryland.

For much of the time from the late 1990s to 2008, it operated at only 10,000 watts. While this provided a decent signal to Baltimore itself and most of its close-in suburbs, many of Baltimore's outer suburbs, including Annapolis, only got a grade B signal. In 2008, it increased its power to 15,500 watts, giving it a coverage area roughly comparable to the other major Baltimore stations.

In May 2021, WYPR announced plans to acquire Towson-based WTMD, an adult album alternative station owned by Towson University. The $3 million deal is contingent on Federal Communications Commission approval. WTMD will retain its format and programming. The sale was closed on November 10, 2021, officially making WTMD a sister station to WYPR.

Repeaters

Programs
 "A Blue View," hosted by National Aquarium (Baltimore) CEO John Racanelli
 "All Things Considered," hosted by Audie Cornish, Ari Shapiro, Mary Louise Kelly, and Ailsa Chang
 "Cellar Notes" with Al Spoler and Hugh Sisson
 "ClearPath - Your Roadmap to Health & Wealth" with Greg Tucker
 Election Coverage
 "Foreman and Wolf on Food and Wine" with Tony Foreman and Cindy Wolf
 "Fresh Air" with Terry Gross
 "Future City" with Wes Moore
 "Gil Sandler's Baltimore Stories" 
 "Here and Now" with Robin Young and Jeremy Hobson
 "Humanities Connection" with Dr. Phoebe Stein
 "In the Bromo" with Tom Hall
 "Inspiring Moments," in partnership with Kennedy Krieger Institute
 "Midday" with Tom Hall, formerly hosted by Dan Rodricks
 "More Than Words," hosted by Jonna McKone and Jamyla Krempel
 "Morning Edition" hosted by Steve Inskeep, Rachel Martin, Noel King, and local host Nathan Sterner
 "On Being with Krista Tippet"
 "On Point" with Meghna Chakrabarti
 "On the Record" with Sheilah Kast
 "Out of the Blocks" with Aaron Henkin and Wendel Patrick
 "Radio Kitchen" with Al Spoler and Jerry Pelligrino
 "Sports at Large" with Milton Kent
 "The Checkup: How Health Care Is Changing In Maryland" with Sheilah Kast
 "The Environment in Focus" with Tom Felton
 "The First Five Years" with Linnea Anderson
 "The Morning Economic Report" with Anirban Basu
 "The Nature of Things" with W. Brooks Paternotte
 "The New Yorker Radio Hour" with David Remnick
 "The Signal," hosted by Aaron Henkin, Lisa Morgan, and Andy Bienstock (currently on hiatus)
 "The Weekly Reader," hosted by Lisa Morgan and Marion Winik
 "University of Maryland Medical Center Commentaries"
 "What Are You Reading?" with Tom Hall
 "Why Baltimore" with Shannon C. Landwehr
 "Your Maryland" with Ric Cottom
 "Your Retirement" with Anirban Basu

Newsroom Series 

 "On Pills and Needles: Maryland's Opioid Crisis" with Rachel Baye (2017)
 "Eight and Out: Transgender in the Second Grade" with Mary Rose Madden (2017)
 "Chesapeake Bay Collaborative" (2015-7) 
 "On The Watch:  Fixing the Fractured Relationship Between Baltimore's Police and Its Communities," by Mary Rose Madden (2015-6)
 "Up With Neighborhoods: A Southwest Baltimore Partnership" with Frasier Smith (2015-6)
 "Rockets' Red Glare: the War, the Song, and their Legacies" (2013-4)
 "Deconstructing Vacants" with P. Kenneth Burns (2014)
 "Sparrows Point: The Plan, The Cleanup, and The Promise" with Paul Lee (2015)
 "Common Core: A Work in Progress" with Gwendolyn Glenn (2014)

Events
WYPR is a media sponsor of the local Patterson Park Concert Series throughout the summer months. In addition, the radio station is also a media partner of Stevenson University's Baltimore Speakers Series at the Meyerhoff Symphony Hall in Baltimore.

Awards
 In 2014, WYPR's production The Lines Between Us earned a DuPont-Columbia Award for outstanding journalism, one of the highest awards in American journalism.
 WYPR was honored by the Chesapeake Associated Press in 2016 for a series on pedestrian safety in Ocean City, as well as reporting on the April 2015 rioting in Baltimore, and a commentary entitled “A Shattered City and a Search for Justice.”
 Also in 2016, the Chesapeake Associated Press and the Public Radio News Directors, Inc. selected On the Watch, a year-long series by reporter Mary Rose Madden on police reform in Baltimore after the death of Freddie Gray, for an award of excellence.
 WYPR's series Out of the Blocks was honored with a 2016 regional Edward R. Murrow Award for outstanding documentary. Out of the Blocks brings real stories of struggle, survival, and celebration in Baltimore City to listeners in a format that includes an original musical score for each episode by Baker-award-winning composer Wendel Patrick. Out of the Blocks was also named “Best Radio Series” by Baltimore's City Paper in 2016.
 Best of Baltimore Readers' Poll named WYPR "Best Radio Station" in 2017, in addition to naming WYPR's Tom Hall "Best Radio Show Host" (runners up being Nathan Sterner and Sheilah Kast, also of WYPR) and naming wypr.org "Best Website (News)." The radio station was also runner-up for both "Best Instagram Account" and "Best Twitter Account."

References

External links

Charles Village, Baltimore
Frederick County, Maryland
YPR
NPR member stations
Radio stations established in 1979
1979 establishments in Maryland